Matthew Ray Palmer (born 16 February 2000) is a New Zealand footballer who currently plays for Eastern Suburbs as a forward.

Career statistics

Club

Notes

References

Living people
2000 births
New Zealand association footballers
New Zealand expatriate association footballers
New Zealand youth international footballers
Association football forwards
New Zealand Football Championship players
Singapore Premier League players
Eastern Suburbs AFC players
Vejle Boldklub players
Geylang International FC players
New Zealand expatriate sportspeople in Denmark
Expatriate men's footballers in Denmark
New Zealand expatriate sportspeople in Singapore
Expatriate footballers in Singapore